Maratus lobatus is a species of the peacock spider genus, characterised by its distinctive courtship display. They are found on the south coast of Western Australia and in South Australia.

References

Further reading
Maddison, Wayne P. "A phylogenetic classification of jumping spiders (Araneae: Salticidae)." Journal of Arachnology 43.3 (2015): 231-292.
Waldock, Julianne M. "A new species of peacock spider, Maratus proszynskii sp. nov.(Araneae: Salticidae: Euophryini), from Tasmania, with a review of Maratus in Tasmania, Australia." RECORDS OF THE WESTERN AUSTRALIAN MUSEUM 144.150 (2015): 150.

External links
BBC News video
Australian Geographic video

Salticidae
Spiders of Australia
Spiders described in 2016